Anolis ustus is a species of lizard in the family Dactyloidae. The species is found in Mexico, Belize, and Guatemala.

References

Anoles
Reptiles of Mexico
Reptiles of Belize
Reptiles of Guatemala
Reptiles described in 1864
Taxa named by Edward Drinker Cope